Pavol Hudák (7 October 1959 in Vranov nad Toplou, Czechoslovakia – 18 January 2011 in Poprad, Slovakia) was a Slovak poet, journalist and publicist.

Biography
He grew up and studied grammar school in Vyšný Žipov. After high school in the Vranov nad Topľou (1975–1979) he studied at the Pedagogical Faculty, University of Pavol Jozef Šafárik in Prešov (1979–1983). During each year of study, he was rewarded by various prizes at events as Akademický Prešov, Wolkrová Polianka or other competitions. His first poems were published in periodicals New Word for Young, Dotyky, Kultúrny Život and others. Between 1983 and 1992 he worked as a teacher in a grammar school, between 1992 and 1995 he worked as local newspaper journalist in Poprad and Vysoké Tatry area, since 1995 as journalist in Nový Čas, Korzár, Pravda, Žurnál or Farmár.

Pavol Hudák is one of the most established Slovak authors. Sensitive and remarkable poet with true testimony. Author of various radio auditions and music songs. Laureate of many literary awards.

Works
In 1992 he released his debut collection of poetry Peachy twilight, which is devoted to the themes of family roots in Zemplin area and individual – collective past. Book published in Levoca by the Vydavatelstvo Modrý Peter was rewarded by the Janko Kráľ award and Slovak Literature Ivan Krasko award for the best debut of the year. For his second collection, called New Year's Eve 1999 he received the VUB award in 1994 for the best collection of poems for adults. In 1999 he published his third collection, Solar Eclipse. On the basis of previous selection he released poetic opus called Rope in the hangman's house and other poems (2003), decorated with drawings of the painter Peter Kocák from Prešov.

His poems have been translated into Hungarian, Polish and French. He taught students at Warsaw University. The poem called Christ comes to Sarajevo was used by the well known composer Ivan Hrušovský in Requiem at the end of Millennium. It was presented at the Music Festival in Bratislava, in 1999.

 1992 Peachy twilight
 1994 New Year's Eve 1999
 1999 Solar Eclipse
 2003 Rope in the hangman's house

Bibliography
 Bibliography

External links
 Pavol Hudák a jeho básne 
 Pavol Hudák – Poet
 

1959 births
Slovak poets
People from Vranov nad Topľou
2011 deaths
20th-century poets